The Nièvre is a river in central France, a right tributary of the Loire. It flows through the département Nièvre.

Its source is in Champlemy. It flows generally south, through Guérigny, Urzy, and empties into the Loire in the town centre of Nevers.

References

Rivers of France
Rivers of Nièvre
Rivers of Bourgogne-Franche-Comté